Ulf Tomas Axnér (born 30 November 1969) is a Swedish former handball player and current coach of the Sweden women's national team. Between 2012 and 2020 he coached Lugi HF, except for a one-year break. As a player he played in the Handball-Bundesliga for VfL Gummersbach and GWD Minden.

He coached Sweden at the 2020 European Women's Handball Championship.

His daughter Tyra Axnér is also a handball player.

References

External links

1969 births
Living people
Swedish male handball players
Swedish handball coaches
Handball players from Stockholm
Handball coaches of international teams
Swedish expatriate sportspeople in Germany
Expatriate handball players
VfL Gummersbach players
Handball-Bundesliga players